Rasbora atranus is a species of cyprinid fish in the genus Rasbora. It is found in Borneo in Indonesia.

References 

Rasboras
Freshwater fish of Borneo
Taxa named by Maurice Kottelat
Taxa named by Heok Hui Tan
Fish described in 2011